Rhabdomiris striatellus is a bug found widespread through the Europe with the exception of the extreme north and the southern Mediterranean.Its range extends east across Asia Minor to the Caucasus. It is common in the British Isles. The species is associated with oak trees. The body of the insect reaches . The body is yellow to reddish brown and has yellow veins and dark stripes on its wings. The bug can also be much darker and similar to its relative, Miris striatus. The larvae suck flowers and fruits while the adults prey on aphids and the larvae of other insects.

References

External links

Miridae
Hemiptera of Europe
Insects described in 1794
Taxa named by Johan Christian Fabricius